Smart Girls Don't Talk is a 1948 crime film directed by Richard L. Bare and starring Virginia Mayo and Bruce Bennett.

Plot
When small-time hood Johnny Warjack and his gang hold up the Club Bermuda, a nightclub/gambling den, he is recognized. Club owner Marty Fain (Bruce Bennett) orders his men to deal with Warjack and offers to make good his patrons' losses. Socialite Linda Vickers (Virginia Mayo) and gambler Nelson Clark (Ben Welden) both try to take advantage of Fain's generosity.  He does not believe either of them. Nonetheless, Fain deducts Clark's claimed $10,000 loss from his outstanding debts, but then demands the remaining $13,000 be paid within a week.

As for Vickers' $18,000 of stolen jewelry, she claims to have an insurance policy for that amount. Fain insists on seeing it, so they head for her apartment. The nightclub attendant says her car is parked far away, so Fain drives the woman home in his car. At her apartment, Vickers admits she lied. Fain is not surprised, having read of her financial troubles in the newspaper. They begin seeing each other.

The next morning, Vickers is awoken by police Lieutenant McReady (Richard Rober). Warjack was found murdered, and her car was spotted at the scene. Vickers has an alibi and sees no reason to divulge her suspicions. When she tells Fain of McReady's visit and mentions her excellent memory, Fain writes her a check for $18,000. She later returns it uncashed and breaks up with him.

Her brother, "Doc" (Robert Hutton), arrives in the city to take up a new medical job. He does not approve of his sister's boyfriend, though he does not mind being introduced by Fain to Toni Peters (Helen Westcott), the club's singer.

When Fain's men return empty-handed from trying to collect from Clark, he takes matters into his own hands. He sneaks into Clark's building and kills him, but is shot and seriously wounded himself. He manages to return to the nightclub before falling unconscious. One of his men spots Doc in the club and gets him to take care of the wound. However, when Doc refuses to accept a large bribe to keep him from reporting it to the police, Fain sends his hoodlums to persuade him to change his mind. When Doc tries to run, one of them shoots him.

Vickers takes the news of her brother's murder hard. She agrees to help McReady try to incriminate Fain. Fain is suspicious when she asks him to take her back, especially since it is so soon after Doc's murder. When they are in her apartment, he finds a hidden tape recorder and turns it off. He then confesses he killed Clark, but that his gunman murdered Doc against his orders. Unbeknownst to him, there is also a hidden microphone, and the police are waiting when they emerge from the apartment. Fain is ready to give up, but Doc's killer uses Vickers as a shield. Fain struggles with him, and both men are killed by the police.

Cast
Virginia Mayo as Linda Vickers
Bruce Bennett as Marty Fain
Robert Hutton as "Doc" Vickers
Tom D'Andrea as Sparky Lynch
Richard Rober as Lt. McReady
Helen Westcott as Toni Peters
Richard Benedict as Cliff Saunders
Ben Welden as Nelson Clark
Richard Walsh as Johnny Warjak
Harry Hayden as ballistics expert

External links

1948 films
1948 crime drama films
American black-and-white films
American crime drama films
Films directed by Richard L. Bare
Films scored by David Buttolph
Warner Bros. films
1940s English-language films
1940s American films